Oglesby High School or Oglesby School is a 1A public high school located in Oglesby, Texas (USA). It is part of the Oglesby Independent School District located in far eastern Coryell County. In 2015, the school was rated "Improvement Required" by the Texas Education Agency.

Athletics
The Oglesby Tigers compete in the following sports:

Basketball
Cross Country
6-Man Football
Golf
Tennis
Track and Field
Volleyball

See also

List of high schools in Texas
List of Six-man football stadiums in Texas

References

External links
Oglesby ISD

Schools in Coryell County, Texas
Public high schools in Texas
Public middle schools in Texas
Public elementary schools in Texas